Skuld (the name possibly means "debt" and is related to the English word "should") is a Norn in Norse mythology. Along with Urðr (Old Norse "fate") and Verðandi (possibly "happening" or "present"), Skuld makes up a trio of Norns that are described as deciding the fates of people. Skuld appears in at least two poems as a Valkyrie.

Poetic Edda
Skuld is mentioned in Völuspá, a poem collected in the 13th century Poetic Edda:

Prose Edda

Gylfaginning
In the Prose Edda book Gylfaginning, Snorri informs the reader that the youngest Norn, Skuld, is in effect also a valkyrie, taking part in the selection of warriors from the slain:
These are called Valkyrs: them Odin sends to every battle; they determine men's feyness and award victory. Gudr and Róta and the youngest Norn, she who is called Skuld, ride ever to take the slain and decide fights."

Nafnaþulur
In the Nafnaþulur addition to Snorri Sturluson's Prose Edda the following sections reference Skuld:

See also
 Antevorta
 Atropos

Notes

References
 Orchard, Andy (1997). Dictionary of Norse Myth and Legend. Cassell. 

Norns
Valkyries
Female supernatural figures in Norse mythology
Textiles in folklore
Time and fate goddesses
Gýgjar